George Bishop is the name of:

 George Bishop (astronomer) (1785–1861), British astronomer
 George Bishop's Observatory, the observatory built by Bishop in London
 George Bishop (priest) (1852–1939), Australian Anglican, Archdeacon of Kyneton
 George Bishop (footballer) (1901–?), Welsh football player
 George Bishop (civil servant) (1913–1999), British civil servant
 George Bishop (businessman) (born 1937), American oil industry billionaire
 George Bishop (rugby league) (1902–1972), Australian rugby league footballer

See also
 George Bishop Sudworth (1864–1927), American botanist